The Senate of Ireland (Seanad Éireann) is the current upper house of the Oireachtas (Irish legislature).

Senate of Ireland may also refer to:

 Senate of Northern Ireland (1921–1972), the upper house of the Parliament of Northern Ireland
 Senate of Southern Ireland (1922), the upper house of the Parliament of Southern Ireland 
 Senate of the Irish Free State (1922–1936), the upper house of the Oireachtas (parliament) of the Irish Free State